Sainte-Geneviève (sometimes Sainte-Geneviève-en-Bray) is a commune in the Seine-Maritime department in the Normandy region in northern France.

Geography
Three small tributaries of the river Béthune have their source in the land around the commune.

Population

Places of interest
 The church of St. Geneviève, dating from the thirteenth century.
 The chateau of Mainemare and its park.

See also
Communes of the Seine-Maritime department

References

Communes of Seine-Maritime